Honey Grove Independent School District is a 2A public school district based in Honey Grove, Texas, United States.

History
On July 1, 1987, Windom Independent School District merged into Honey Grove ISD, and as a result the district was renamed the Honey Grove Consolidated Independent School District.

The district built a new high school and a new track during the 2008-09 school year. Honey Grove is recognized for its academic achievement. In 2009, the school district was rated "academically acceptable" by the Texas Education Agency. In addition to Honey Grove, the district also serves the town of Windom. Located in Fannin County, a small portion of the district extends into Lamar County.

Schools 
 Honey Grove High School (Grades 9-12)
 Honey Grove Middle (Grades 6-8)
 Honey Grove Elementary (Grades PK-5)

References

External links 
 

School districts in Fannin County, Texas
School districts in Lamar County, Texas
School districts established in 1987
1987 establishments in Texas